Chalus County is in Mazandaran province, Iran. The capital of the county is the city of Chalus. At the 2006 census, the county's population was 119,559 in 33,193 households. The following census in 2011 counted 122,736 people in 37,756 households. At the 2016 census, the county's population was 116,542 in 39,105 households, by which time Kelardasht Rural District and the city of Kelardasht had been separated from the county to form Kelardasht County.

The warm, humid climate of Chalus was formerly considered unhealthy, and the bulk of the population of Chalus, as of all other towns in this region, used to migrate in summer to the summer pastures on the slopes around Delir and in the Kelardasht basin, one of the most popular and longest-settled districts in the region. The people residing in Chalus speak Mazanderani language. People of Chalus speak Mazanderani language In the west of Chalus, the dialect of kalarestaqi  is spoken and in the east of Chalus, the dialect of Kojuri. During the Pahlavi dynasty, a group of Langrud people migrated from Gilan to Chalus. The Langrudis living in Chalus speak Eastern Gilaki. The Eastern Gilaki language is spoken in the entire valley of the Chalus river, though some Kurdish tribes were established in Kojur and Kelardasht in the Qajar period

Administrative divisions

The population history and structural changes of Chalus County's administrative divisions over three consecutive censuses are shown in the following table. The latest census shows two districts, four rural districts, and three cities.

References

 

Counties of Mazandaran Province